The Royal Blackburn Teaching Hospital is an acute District General Hospital in Blackburn, Lancashire operated by the East Lancashire Hospitals NHS Trust.

History
The original hospital on the site was established as an infirmary for the local workhouse in February 1864. Additions included a medical wing in 1903, a children's wing in 1925 and a 74-bed annexe in 1926. In 1929 it became known as the Queen's Park Institution, a name which evolved to become the Queen's Park Hospital.

A new hospital, to be known as the Royal Blackburn Teaching Hospital, was procured under a Private Finance Initiative contract in 2003 to replace the Queen's Park Hospital and the Blackburn Royal Infirmary. It was built by Balfour Beatty at a cost of £133 million and opened in July 2006.

In 2019 the government gave approval for a £10million "care village" to be constructed on the existing site, providing an additional 31 accident and emergency beds.

References

External links
 

Buildings and structures in Blackburn
Hospitals in Lancashire
Hospital buildings completed in 1864
NHS hospitals in England